Gnesta is a bimunicipal locality and the seat of Gnesta Municipality, Södermanland County, Sweden with 5,562 inhabitants in 2010.

Gnesta is located in Södermanland, on the border to Stockholm County. As situated near the county boundary Gnesta is served by Stockholm commuter rail which has a terminus here.

Gnesta is the location for the 2009 film adaptation of the Stieg Larsson book The Girl with the Dragon Tattoo, representing the fictional Hedestad and Hedeby Island.

References 

Populated places in Södermanland County
Populated places in Stockholm County
Populated places in Gnesta Municipality
Populated places in Södertälje Municipality
Municipal seats of Södermanland County
Swedish municipal seats

it:Gnesta (comune)